The Nigerian Institute of Architects (NIA) is a professional body for architects primarily in Nigeria.

History
The idea for the formation of an independent professional architect's organization in Nigeria was first conceived and motivated by three architects. In 1958, an 8 member study group was formed to carry out detailed planning for the establishment of the Institute which ultimately culminated in inauguration of the Institute. The Nigerian Institute of Architects (NIA) was founded on the 1st of April 1960.

Structure
The NIA is a member organisation of professional Architects, with the objective of promoting the practice of the profession of Architecture in Nigeria. It has approximately 6000 full members, associates, graduates and student members in 32 State Chapters. It is a member of the International Union of Architects and a founding member of both the Commonwealth Association of Architects and the Africa Union of Architects.  It is a non-governmental organization, but performs some statutory functions on behalf of the Architects Registration Council of Nigeria, and cooperates with governmental and non-governmental agencies and institutions.
The NIA conducts examinations with the Architects Registration Council of Nigeria, and may be called to arbitrate in cases of dispute or liability.

Background
The NIA was conceived by three Nigerian architects and founded on 1 April 1960, as an association of independent professional architects with the aims and objectives of fostering friendship amongst members, cater for their welfare and establish mutual support and cooperation amongst them. The NIA had 13 members initially, which had now grown to about 6000 in 5 classes of membership including Fellows, Full members, Associates, Graduates and Students members, in 31 Chapters.

The Nigerian Institute of Architects is a member of the International Union of Architects (UIA), a founding member of both the Commonwealth Association of Architects (CAA) and the Africa Union of Architects (AUA).

References

External links
Nigerian Institute of Architects

1960 establishments in Nigeria
Architecture-related professional associations
Arts organizations established in 1960
Commonwealth Association of Architects
Professional associations based in Nigeria